Boa Island is an island near the north shore of Lower Lough Erne in County Fermanagh, Northern Ireland.

The A47 road goes through the length of the island. This road joins each end of the island to the mainland by bridges leading west toward Castle Caldwell and east toward Kesh.

Boa Island features a counterscarp rath (grid ref: H0744 6250) as well as carved stones, graveyard and enclosure (grid ref: H0852 6197), all in Dreenan townland and all Scheduled Historic Monuments. The Lustymore stone figure was moved here in 1939 from the nearby island of that name. The oldest stone monument on the island is a denuded cairn at Inishkeeragh Bridge near the southern tip of the island.

Name of the island

Boa Island is named after Badhbh, sometimes spelled, Badb, the Celtic goddess of war. Badhbh sometimes took the form of a carrion crow, most notably on the shoulder of the warrior, Cúchulainn, after he died in battle. At other times she is depicted as a wolf.

She is one of a triad of Celtic war goddesses that included her sisters, Macha and Morrigan. They were born to a mother goddess, Ernmas, who is mentioned in Lebor Gabála Érenn and Cath Maige Tuired as one of the Tuatha Dé Danann.

Badb is said to have caused confusion among the enemy in battles, providing victories to her side. Battlefields were named, the land of the Badb, by the Celts in Ireland.

Stone figures

Two unrelated anthropomorphic carved stone statues called the Boa Island figure and the Lustymore Island figure are now found together in Caldragh graveyard on Boa Island. Caldragh graveyard dates from the Irish early Christian period (400–800 AD). Both of the figures were badly damaged when they were first found. They have been placed beside each other on unrelated pillars in the graveyard which is the original location of the Boa figure. A canopy was placed over them to protect them from the weather, however this has since been removed. Both of the stone figures are generally accepted to be the likeness of pagan deities.

The larger of the figures is the Boa Island bilateral figure. It is regarded as one of the most enigmatic and remarkable stone figures in Ireland. It is called a Janus-figure because it has two faces, reminding some of the Roman two-headed deity Janus, however, it is not a representation of Janus. It is thought to represent a Celtic deity and could represent a Celtic goddess as readily as a god, especially given the name of the island. In Celtic culture, heads were very important because they were thought to contain a person's spirit after their death. Severed heads were taken in triumph after battles.

Each side of the figure has a face and torso. On the sides of the stone where the two carved figures are joined, is an interlace design that may represent hair. The faces are large and pointed ovals in shape, with big eyes, straight noses, and half open mouths with protruding tongues above the pointed chins.

The figure has no neck, with its head resting directly on its torso. The torso is a square block with hunched shoulders, crossed arms, and a belt. The figure ends just below its waist. The lower section of the figure—two hands with elongated fingers carved in relief—was broken away from the top part at an unknown time in the past. This base was recently discovered half-buried in the ground close to the figure.

In the top of the bilateral figure is carved a deep indentation of unknown purpose, and tourists often place small mementos in it for good luck. Fears of damage from freeze-thaw erosion have motivated authorities to provide a canopy over the statue.

The Nobel Prize winning poet Seamus Heaney celebrated the enigmatic Boa Island bilateral figure's similarity to the Roman deity Janus in his poem "January God". The Enniskillen-born poet Francis Harvey published a collection of poems called The Boa Island Janus in 1996.
Similar statues appear outside the cave of Crom Cruach in The Secret of Kells.

The Lustymore Idol was discovered in an early Christian graveyard on Lustymore Island, located due south of Boa Island in Lower Lough Erne. It was brought to the Caldragh graveyard on Boa Island in 1939. It is placed with its back to the indigenous bilateral figure. It is, however, thought to be older than the bilateral 'Janus' figure – which is less worn than the Lustymore figure. Irish archaeologist Eileen Murphy states in Warrior Women (2002) that the Lustymore Idol is thought by some Irish scholars to be the precursor to Sheela na gigs: her arms lie across the torso and point toward the inverted V that represents the top of the vulva (page 204). A Sheela-na-gig is a female figure with enlarged genitals held open by her hands. Note the current offerings to the statue in the photograph above.

The reasons for creating these stone sculptures and the dates of their creation are not certain. They may have been part of pre-Christian religious sites, or they may have been made by early Christians who included older pagan beliefs in their grave sites.
Boa Island's bilateral figure has been compared to another two-faced figure from Holzgerlingen, Germany and the Tandragee Idol, which is in a collection in St. Patrick's Church of Ireland Cathedral, Armagh.

These comparisons suggest that the figure may date to the Iron Age. However, early Christian sites around Lough Erne are rich in these types of figures.

Plane Crash
On 9 January 1944, a Royal Air Force Consolidated PBY Catalina (FP193) flying boat departed RAF Killadeas on a bombing exercise. The aircraft crashed into the lough near the island after the crew lost control during a turn. Seven of the ten crewmen died in the crash.

See also 
 List of archaeological sites in County Fermanagh
 List of townlands in County Fermanagh
 Janus
 Sheela na gig

References

External links 

 Panorama of the Boa Island and Lustymore figures, The Irish Times
 Landscapes Unlocked – Aerial footage from the BBC Sky High series explaining the physical, social, and economic geography of Northern Ireland
Google Earth view

Archaeological sites in County Fermanagh
Aviation accidents and incidents locations in Northern Ireland
Celtic stone heads
Islands of County Fermanagh
Lake islands of Northern Ireland
Scheduled monuments in Northern Ireland
Townlands of County Fermanagh